Andree Saint-Amour (born March 20, 1996) is an American football defensive end for the New Orleans Breakers of the United States Football League (USFL). He played college football at Georgia Tech. He began his professional career in the National Football League as an undrafted free agent in 2019 with the Minnesota Vikings. He also signed a deal in the Canadian Football League (CFL) with the BC Lions.

Early life
Saint-Amour was born in 1996 in Suwanee, Georgia as one of two children to Manfred and Frednise Saint-Amour. Saint-Amour's older brother Manrey, played as an offensive lineman for Georgia Southern.

High school career
While at North Gwinnett, Saint-Amour was team captain during his senior year and was named All-State and All-Region. He also earned a letter which he signed for Georgia Tech after declining offers from Iowa, Michigan State, Minnesota, and Stanford.

College career
During his true freshman year in 2015, Saint-Amour played 8 out of 13 games. He finished his first season with 8 tackles. He played as a defensive end during his sophomore season in all 13 games. He remained a defensive end throughout the remainder of his college seasons. While at Georgia Tech, Saint-Amour majored in business administration.

Professional career

Minnesota Vikings
It was reported on April 27, 2019, that Saint-Amour signed with the Minnesota Vikings after going undrafted in the 2019 NFL Draft.

BC Lions
During September 2019, Saint-Amour signed with the BC Lions of the Canadian Football League (CFL).

The Spring League 
Saint-Amour was a member of the TSL Conquerors.

New Orleans Breakers
Saint-Amour was selected in the 3rd round of the 2022 USFL Draft by the New Orleans Breakers of the United States Football League (USFL). He was signed originally as an offensive tackle before being assigned to defensive end.

References

Further reading

Living people
1996 births
Players of American football from Georgia (U.S. state)
New Orleans Breakers (2022) players
Georgia Tech Yellow Jackets football players
American football offensive tackles
American football defensive ends